Cure all may refer to:

 Panacea (medicine), a remedy that is claimed to be able to cure any disease
 Cure All, an album by keyboardist Robert Walter
 Cure-All, a 19th-century racehorse
 Cure-All, an unch, inks or inner scheduled during a time of unrest typically coinciding with changes in political leadership or the annual distribution of the new comp plan at wirehouses